Pia Lovrič (born 23 April 2002) is a Slovenian tennis player.

Lovrič has a career-high singles ranking by the Women's Tennis Association (WTA) of 631, reached on 22nd of November 2021. She also has a career-high WTA doubles ranking of 458, achieved on 15th of November 2021.

Lovrič represents Slovenia in the Fed Cup.

ITF Circuit finals

Singles: 5 (1 title, 4 runner–ups)

Doubles: 8 (4 titles, 4 runner–ups)

ITF Junior Circuit results

Singles: 5 (1 title, 4 runner-ups)

Doubles: 14 (6 titles, 8 runner-ups)

National representation

Billie Jean King Cup
Lovrič made her Billie Jean King Cup debut for Slovenia in 2020, while the team was competing in the Europe/Africa Zone Group I, when she was 17 years and 289 days old.

Fed Cup participation

Doubles (1–2)

References

External links
 
 
 

2002 births
Living people
Slovenian female tennis players
Sportspeople from Ljubljana